Early parliamentary elections were held in Nauru on  2010 after the previous parliamentary election in April 2010 had resulted in a deadlock between government and opposition, tied at nine seats each. This led to an extended state of emergency in Nauru as a result of this election.

Background
The election occurred during a state of emergency imposed by President of Nauru Marcus Stephen. Voters were given just one week's notice for the date of the election.

Results
The result was no clear majority, meaning a hung parliament.

One MP belonging to the opposition failed to be re-elected, while all 17 others were re-elected. Independent MP Milton Dube holds the balance of power. The Nauru Parliament's two groups must compete for his support. Dube was elected in Aiwo constituency, unseating Dantes Tsitsi of the Opposition. The new MP declared himself independent, and stated he would support the side which would do the most for his constituency. He wants to reduce the levels of phosphate dust from a problematic drying plant. The MP in favour of government, Doctor Kieren Keke, planned to discuss the matter with Dube within a week of his election. Parliament have scheduled a sitting on the Tuesday morning following the election.

Aftermath
Aloysius Amwano was elected as speaker on 30 June, but demanded that Stephen stand down as president. Stephen's followers agreed to this, but only if the new president came from their ranks, with their preferred nominee being Kieren Keke. However, there are two other contenders, Baron Waqa (the opposition leader) and Godfrey Thoma.

Rykers Solomon, an opposition MP, joined the government on 6 July, but Amwano nonetheless refused to allow a motion to elect the president, suspending parliament until 8 July. Amwano was then dismissed on 7 July by Stephen, but refused to quit. In a short parliamentary session held on 9 July, Deputy Speaker Landon Deireragea announced that he had assumed the Speaker's position.

Following further disagreements, the president called a state of emergency.

On 1 November former President Ludwig Scotty was elected Speaker, ending the deadlock.  Marcus Stephen was subsequently re-elected as President, defeating Milton Dube 11 to 6.

References

Nauru
Parliamentary election
2010 06
2010 06
2010